"Fifty Grand for Christmas" or "50K for Christmas" is a holiday single by Paul Holt. It was released by Sanctuary Records on December 6, 2004. The song was written by Bradley and Stewart James, who also penned Nick Berry's #1 single "Every Loser Wins". The lyrics revolve around a bet that Simon Cowell made with auditionee Paul Holt during auditions for The X Factor, that he would pay him £50,000 if he got a #1 single. Holt was quickly signed by a record label - and backed by X Factor judge Sharon Osbourne - to release "Fifty Grand for Christmas", which only charted at #35 in the UK.  The song was a pastiche of Roy Wood's style, though Holt's singing voice is similar to that of Gary Puckett.

References

British Christmas songs
2004 songs
2004 singles
Sanctuary Records singles